Beaufort Street is a major road in the inner north-eastern suburbs of Perth, Western Australia, connecting the Morley area to the Perth central business district. For most of its length, it is a single-carriageway, two-way road with two lanes in each direction.

Since 2011, the street has played host to the community focused Beaufort Street Festival. In 2013, over 120,000 people attended the festival, making it one of Perth's largest street festivals.

Route description
Beaufort Street begins at Wellington Street in the  CBD, continuing north from Barrack Street. It heads northeast towards the Morley area, terminating in a cul de sac near Coode Street. Another section of Beaufort St runs between Coode Street and Drake Street.

Beaufort Street is a popular shopping and eating strip, especially in Mount Lawley and Inglewood. The Astor Cinema is also on Beaufort Street.

It is one of the most heavily patronised bus corridors in Perth, served by Transperth's most frequent suburban bus route 950 and limited stops route 66 for its entire length, and by routes 67 and 68 between Perth and Grand Promenade, Bedford.

History
Beaufort Street has existed since at least 1848. The road was macadamised in 1870. The road was initially built to service the Mount Lawley area in the early 19th century.

In 1907, work began on reconstructing the Beaufort Street Bridge, which connected the road to Wellington Street over the railway line.

In 1929, the Town Planning Commission viewed Beaufort Street to be an important arterial road in the future, and agreed with the Bayswater Road Board's plans to extend the road through to Collier Road by resuming land.

Between Wellington Street and Brisbane Street, it was a one-way road, as the continuation of Barrack Street, with southbound traffic directed along Brisbane Street onto William Street. From 7 April 2013, two-way traffic was reintroduced along Beaufort Street. The project also introduced part-time bus lanes, operational (in one direction) during peak times, and available for parking at other times.

Beaufort Street was widened between Central Avenue, Inglewood and Queens Crescent, Mount Lawley. The project was expected to take ten months to complete, from July 2013 to April 2014. Beaufort Street's intersection with Central Avenue was also upgraded, with additional turning lanes and modified traffic light signals. The works enabled the road lanes to be reconfigured as one bus priority lane plus one traffic lane in each direction. A new central median island prevents right turns at most locations along the road.

Major intersections

  Wellington Street (State Route 65) – Perth
 Newcastle Street – Perth
  Bulwer Street (State Route 72) – Perth
 Vincent Street – Mount Lawley
  Walcott Street (State Route 75) – Mount Lawley
 Central Avenue – Mount Lawley and Inglewood
  Grand Promenade (State Route 55) – Bedford
  Broun Avenue (State Route 53) – Bedford

See also

References

 
Roads in Perth, Western Australia
Mount Lawley, Western Australia